Phelekezela Mphoko (born 11 June 1940) is a Zimbabwean politician, diplomat, businessman and former military commander who served as Second Vice-President of Zimbabwe from 2014 until 2017, as well as Zimbabwe's ambassador to Russia, Botswana and South Africa. Legally, Mphoko was the acting President of Zimbabwe from 21–24 November 2017, however, as he was not in the country at the time, official standing on this is unclear. Mphoko's term as vice-president was ended by President Emmerson Mnangagwa following the dissolution of the cabinet on 27 November 2017.

Life and career

After independence
Mphoko served as Zimbabwe's Ambassador to Botswana and Russia before being transferred to Pretoria as Ambassador to South Africa.

On 10 December 2014, President Mugabe finally appointed Mphoko as Vice-President, alongside Emmerson Mnangagwa (who represented the ZANU wing of the party). Mugabe also assigned Mphoko the ministerial portfolio of National Healing, Peace and Reconciliation. He was sworn in as Vice-President on 12 December 2014. On 6 July 2015, Mugabe assigned Mphoko responsibility for coordination and implementation of policy.

References 

1940 births
Ambassadors of Zimbabwe to Botswana
Ambassadors of Zimbabwe to Russia
Ambassadors of Zimbabwe to South Africa
Living people
Vice-presidents of Zimbabwe
Zimbabwe People's Revolutionary Army personnel
Zimbabwean diplomats
Zimbabwean Seventh-day Adventists
People from Matabeleland North Province
ZANU–PF politicians